Par and St Blazey Gate is an electoral division of Cornwall in the United Kingdom and returns one member to sit on Cornwall Council. The current Councillor is Jordan Rowse, a Conservative.

Extent
Par and St Blazey Gate covers the village of Par, St Blazey Gate and parts of St Blazey and Bodelva (shared with the St Blazey division), and Polmear (shared with the Fowey and Tywardreath division). The division also covers the Eden Project. The division covers 542 hectares in total.

Election results

2017 election

2013 election

References

St Blazey
Electoral divisions of Cornwall Council